K2 disaster can refer to one of several mountaineering incidents on the mountain K2:

 the 1986 K2 disaster
 the 1995 K2 disaster
 the 2008 K2 disaster